Imran Nackerdien (born 21 April 1990) is a South African cricketer who currently plays for Boland. He is a left-handed batsman and bowls leg break.

References
Imran Nackerdien profile at CricketArchive

1990 births
Living people
South African cricketers
Boland cricketers